Amaranta Asiri Kun Radovic (born 10 December 1993) is an Italian-Peruvian actress established in Lima, Peru.

Life and career 
Granddaughter of Natacha's and Simplemente Maria's actor and producer Vlado Radovich, she studied at the Franco-Peruvian School Lycée Franco-Péruvien, where she showed a vocation for stage arts since age five, acting and directing in school plays, improv groups, courses and workshops in theater, ballet and contemporary dance. At the age of 10 she was cast in the movie The Trial by Peruvian director Judith Vélez.

Her first starring role was in the America Televisión's 2014 miniseries Camino al Triunfo, a TV show about the rise of Latin American lightweight boxing champion Jonathan Maicelo. After finishing production she moved to Lyon to study acting at the ENSATT under the direction of Philippe Delaigue. In 2016 she passed an audition to be a part of the Comédie Française as an academic actress where she performed in their world premiere for Pathé Live.

She currently resides in Peru, where she participates in several theatrical projects. In 2021, she became a founding member of A Mí No Me La Hacen, Peru's first Media Literacy Association, providing workshops in schools, universities and institutes all around her country. In 2021, this association won a prize at UNESCO's Global MIL Awards.

Filmography

Films

Television

Short-Films

Radio

Music Videos

Theatre

Comédie Française 
Performances at the Comédie Française:
 2016: Luchino Visconti's The Damned by Ivo van Hove
 2016: William Shakespeare's Romeo and Juliet by Éric Ruf
 2016: Victor Hugo's Lucrèce Borgia by Denis Podalydès
 2016: Molière's The Misanthrope by Clément Hervieu-Léger
 2017: Jean Renoir's The Rules of the Game by Christiane Jatahy
 2017: Bertolt Brecht's The Resistible Rise of Arturo Ui by Katharina Thalbach
 2017: Georges Feydeau's L'Hôtel du libre échange by Isabelle Nanty
 2017: Edmond Rostand's Cyrano de Bergerac by Denis Podalydès
 2017: Pierre de Marivaux's Double Inconstancy by Anne Kessler
 2017: Robert Garnier's Hippolyte by Didier Sandre

As Director 
 2022: Nuestros Cuerpos sin Memoria by Sarah Delaby-Rochette and Amaranta Kun for the Festival Temporada Alta

Other performances 

 2018: Molière's L'Amour médecin by Gérald Dumont

References

External links

  – official site

Peruvian stage actresses
Peruvian telenovela actresses
Living people
1993 births
21st-century Peruvian actresses
Actresses from Lima
Peruvian expatriates in France